Olipudase alfa, sold under the brand name Xenpozyme, is a medication used for the treatment of non-central nervous system (CNS) manifestations of acid sphingomyelinase deficiency (ASMD) type A/B or type B.

The common side events include infections, infusion-related reactions, or gastrointestinal complaints (disease signs and symptoms in children).

Historically referred to as Niemann-Pick disease types A (NPD A) and B (NPD B), ASMD is a genetic disorder. It belongs to the larger family of metabolic disorders called lysosomal storage diseases, in which fats build up within the parts of the body's cells that break down nutrients and other materials. This affects the way cells work and causes them to die, affecting normal functioning of tissues and organs. ASMD is seriously debilitating and life-threatening since the build-up of fatty substances can cause brain damage and swelling of organs such as liver and spleen.

Xenpozyme is the first ASMD-specific treatment. This medicine is an enzyme replacement therapy, developed to replace patients' deficient or defective enzyme, acid sphingomyelinase (ASM), and thereby reduce fat accumulation within cells and relieve some of the symptoms of the disease. The highest potential for clinical benefit is expected in patients with chronic visceral forms of ASMD (type B). The replacement enzyme is produced by a method known as recombinant DNA technology: it is made by cells into which a gene (DNA) has been introduced, that enables them to produce the enzyme.

Olipudase alfa was approved for medical use in Japan in March 2022, in the European Union in June 2022, and in the United States in August 2022. The US Food and Drug Administration (FDA) considers it to be a first-in-class medication.

Society and culture 
Olipudase alfa is the international nonproprietary name (INN).

Legal status 
Olipudase alfa was approved for medical use in Japan in March 2022.

On 19 May 2022, the Committee for Medicinal Products for Human Use (CHMP) of the European Medicines Agency (EMA) adopted a positive opinion, recommending the granting of a marketing authorization for the medicinal product Xenpozyme, intended for the treatment of non-central nervous system (CNS) manifestations of acid sphingomyelinase deficiency (ASMD) type A/B or type B. Xenpozyme was reviewed under the accelerated assessment program of the European Medicines Agency (EMA). The applicant for this medicinal product is Genzyme Europe BV. Olipudase alfa was approved for medical use in the European Union in June 2022.

References

Further reading

External links 
 

Orphan drugs
Sanofi